Robert Samuel Nixon (22 May 1909 – 21 September 1997)
was a unionist politician in Northern Ireland.

Bob Nixon studied at Mountjoy School in Dublin, then at Queen's University, Belfast, where he qualified as a doctor of medicine.  At the 1953 Northern Ireland general election, he was elected for the Ulster Unionist Party in North Down.

In 1965, Nixon revealed that unionists in Derry had helped convince the Government of Northern Ireland to site the New University of Ulster in Coleraine, rather than their own city, which had a Roman Catholic majority.  In response to this, he was suspended from the Parliamentary party for several months.  He stood down at the 1969 Northern Ireland general election, but stood unsuccessfully as an independent Unionist in the 1970 general election, again in North Down.

References

1909 births
1998 deaths
Alumni of Queen's University Belfast
Members of the House of Commons of Northern Ireland 1953–1958
Members of the House of Commons of Northern Ireland 1958–1962
Members of the House of Commons of Northern Ireland 1962–1965
Members of the House of Commons of Northern Ireland 1965–1969
People educated at Mount Temple Comprehensive School
Ulster Unionist Party members of the House of Commons of Northern Ireland
Members of the House of Commons of Northern Ireland for County Down constituencies